Galmaarden is a municipality located in the Belgian province of Flemish Brabant. The municipality comprises the towns of Galmaarden proper, Tollembeek and Vollezele. It is also situated in the Pajottenland. On January 1, 2006, Galmaarden had a total population of 8,058. The total area is 34.93 km2 which gives a population density of 231 inhabitants per km2. Galmaarden is the current home of the comedian Urbanus, who has a statue in Tollembeek. There is a statue of the stallion Brillant in Vollezele.

References

External links
 
Official website  - Only available in Dutch

Municipalities of Flemish Brabant